Memphis and its Necropolis – the Pyramid Fields from Giza to Dahshur is a World Heritage Site (WHS No. 86). It includes:

 Site of Memphis, WHS No. 086-001
 Pyramid fields from Giza to Dahshur, WHS No. 086-002